Cimarron Canyon State Park is a state park of New Mexico, United States, located  east of Eagle Nest in the Colin Neblett Wildlife Area. The park extends for  along the Cimarron Canyon between Tolby Creek and Ute Park. The Palisades Sill forms spectacular cliffs above the Cimarron River here.

The park is home to a newly constructed visitor's center in the Tolby campground, as well as three developed day use areas. The park includes numerous trails, which are used for hiking in the summer and snow shoeing in the winter, the most popular being the Clear Creek Trail, which follows the Clear Creak and offers views of several small waterfalls. Throughout the year, you can expect to see deer, elk, bear, turkey, and many species of birds. Self pay stations are located throughout the park at all campgrounds and some day use areas. Day use permits are $5 per vehicle per day, although other fees may apply for users of the Colin Neblett Wildlife Area.

Fishing
The park is popular for trout fishing in the Cimarron River and its tributaries, Clear Creek and Tolby Creek. Stocked trout include rainbow and brown. The river is maintained by the New Mexico Department of Game and Fish at a trout density of approximately 3,000 fish per mile, although water flow can vary between 2 and 50 cfs.[2] Fishing season is busiest during the summer months. There is also popular fishing at the Gravel Pit Lakes within the Maverick Campground. The lakes got their names as material was drawn from where the lakes now sit, to be used as base course for U.S. Route 64. The park hosts a children's fishing derby every Mother's day weekend.

Camping
Cimarron Canyon State Park boasts three full campgrounds, which are located along the river between the villages of Eagle Nest and Ute Park. These include the Maverick, Tolby, and Ponderosa campgrounds, as well as Black Jack Tent Area. All three campgrounds offer numerous individual sites for RV or tent camping. Full bathrooms with plumbing (and potable water) are available at each campground, although electricity is not. Campfires are allowed weather permitting, at the discretion of the county fire marshal, in combination with the local park rangers. Normal camping season takes place between the middle of May to mid September, but is usually avoided during the winter months due to snow and freezing temperatures. Camping costs are $10 per night per vehicle and annual camping permits, valid at any New Mexico State Park, are also available.

Gallery

See also
 Philmont Scout Ranch

References

External links
 Cimarron Canyon State Park

State parks of New Mexico
Parks in Colfax County, New Mexico
Protected areas established in 1979
1979 establishments in New Mexico